Oceanside is a city on the  South Coast of California, located in San Diego County. The city had a population of 167,086 at the 2010 census. The city is a popular tourist destination, owing to its historic landmarks, beaches, and architecture.

Oceanside's origins date to 1798, when the Spanish founded the village of San Luis Rey with the establishment of Mission San Luis Rey de Francia by Fermín de Lasuén. During the Spanish period, Mission San Luis Rey grew to be the largest of all the Californian missions, but following the Mexican secularization act of 1833 the mission and its community declined. Following the U.S. conquest of California, the former mission lands were developed into an oceanfront resort and the community's name gradually changed to Oceanside.

History

Originally inhabited by Native Americans, Oceanside was first settled by the Luiseño peoples, or the Payomkawichum. The city of Oceanside sits on the locality on the San Luis Rey River that the Luiseno called Tacayme, which contained the villages of Qée'ish (Keish) and 'ikáymay (Ikamal), in the San Luis Rey Mission area, Wiyóoya (Wiawio) at the mouth of the river, and Wi'áasamay (Wiasamai) and Waxáwmay (Wahaumai) at Guajome.

Spanish era
The first European explorers arrived in 1769. Spanish missionaries under Father Junípero Serra founded Mission San Luis Rey de Francia on a former site of a Luiseño Indian village on the banks of the San Luis Rey River called Keish according to the Portolà expedition who visited in the 1769.

In the early 19th century, the introduction of farming and grazing changed the landscape of what would become Oceanside.

Mexican era

Following the Mexican secularization act of 1833, the Californian missions were nationalized, transferring their ownership from the Franciscan Order of the Catholic Church to the Mexican Government. A mission administrator was appointed to each mission to oversee the process of secularization, the removal of the priests, and the selling or granting of the mission lands to private citizens.

At Mission San Luis Rey, Padre Antonio Peyrí had presided over the mission for 34 years when soldiers forced his removal in late 1833. Captain Pablo de la Portillà was appointed as administrator of San Luis Rey. Following the departure of Padre Peyrí, relations between the Luiseños and the new civilian administration hugely deteriorated, resulting in their famed refusal to work for Captain Portillà in 1835.

American era

In the late 1850s, Andrew Jackson Myers lived in San Joaquin County, but he returned in the late 1880s and lived in San Luis Rey.  In 1882 Myers moved on the land that was the original town site for Oceanside.  A patent for the land was issued in 1883 by the federal government. It was incorporated on July 3, 1888. The city hall as of the early 21st century stands on the former Myers homestead.

The town post office contains an oil-on-canvas mural, Air Mail, painted in 1937 by Elsie Seeds. Federally commissioned murals were produced from 1934 to 1943 in the United States through the Section of Painting and Sculpture, later called the Section of Fine Arts, of the Treasury Department.

In the 20th century, Oceanside was a beach town devoted to activities on a  stretch of beaches. Residential areas like downtown (built in the 1890s), South Oceanside (built in the 1920s and 1930s), and developments east of Interstate 5 (built after World War II) are preserved and remodeled when these houses are considered to have historical value. Since the establishment of Marine Corps Base Camp Pendleton in 1942, Oceanside has been home to U.S. armed forces personnel, and the wartime industry of WWII and the 1950s had an ammunition manufacturing facility in the city.

After 1970, the main focus of Oceanside was suburban development. Oceanside continues to be known as a vacation home market.

In the 2010s, several mid-rise and high-rise housing and lodging projects were completed in the downtown area, with more to come. In 2021, two large Hyatt resorts were completed, bringing more tourists to the city.

Geography

Oceanside is at  (33.211566, -117.325701).

Traveling north on Interstate 5, Oceanside is the last city before Orange County. As the crow flies, it is roughly the same distance from Aliso Viejo as it is to downtown San Diego.

Together with Carlsbad and Vista, it forms a tri-city area.

Climate
Oceanside experiences a semi-arid climate (Köppen climate classification BSh) that is significantly tempered by maritime winds and the cool currents off the shoreline.

Demographics

2010

The 2010 United States Census reported that Oceanside had a population of 167,086. The racial makeup of Oceanside was 109,020 (65.2%) White, 7,873 (4.7%) African American, 1,385 (0.8%) Native American, 11,081 (6.6%) Asian (3.4% Filipino, 0.7% Japanese, 0.7% Vietnamese, 0.6% Chinese, 0.4% Korean, 0.2% Indian), 2,144 (1.3%) Pacific Islander, 25,886 (15.5%) from other races, and 9,697 (5.8%) from two or more races. Hispanic or Latino of any race were 59,947 persons (35.9%).

The Census reported that 166,150 people (99.4% of the population) lived in households, 802 (0.5%) lived in non-institutionalized group quarters, and 134 (0.1%) were institutionalized.

There were 59,238 households, out of which 20,486 (34.6%) had children under the age of 18 living in them, 30,201 (51.0%) were opposite-sex married couples living together, 6,947 (11.7%) had a female householder with no husband present, 3,111 (5.3%) had a male householder with no wife present.  There were 3,504 (5.9%) unmarried opposite-sex partnerships, and 472 (0.8%) same-sex married couples or partnerships. Of the households 14,117 (23.8%) were made up of individuals, and 6,161 (10.4%) had someone living alone who was 65 years of age or older. The average household size was 2.80.  There were 40,259 families (68.0% of all households); the average family size was 3.32.

The population was spread out, with 39,817 people (23.8%) under the age of 18, 19,028 people (11.4%) aged 18 to 24, 45,797 people (27.4%) aged 25 to 44, 40,943 people (24.5%) aged 45 to 64, and 21,501 people (12.9%) who were 65 years of age or older.  The median age was 35.2 years. For every 100 females, there were 97.4 males.  For every 100 females age 18 and over, there were 95.0 males.

The homeowner vacancy rate was 2.2%; the rental vacancy rate was 6.2%. Of the population 97,645 people (58.4%) lived in owner-occupied housing units and 68,505 people (41.0%) lived in rental housing units.

2000
 

As of the census of 2000, there were 161,029 people, 56,488 households, and 39,259 families residing in the city. The population density was 3,967.2 inhabitants per square mile (1,531.7/km2). The racial makeup of the city was 66.4% White, 6.3% African American, 5.5% Asian, 1.2% Pacific Islander, 0.4% Native American or Alaskan Native, 0.1% from another race alone, and 3.2% from two or more races. Hispanic or Latino of any race was 30.2%.

In 2000, there were 56,488 households, out of which 35.0% had children under the age of 18 living with them, 54.1% were married couples living together, 11.0% had a female householder with no husband present, and 30.5% were non-families. Of all households 22.7% were made up of individuals, and 10.2% had someone living alone who was 65 years of age or older.  The average household size was 2.83 and the average family size was 3.33.

The age distribution of Oceanside in 2000 was as follows: 27.6% under the age of 18, 10.2% from 18 to 24, 31.0% from 25 to 44, 17.6% from 45 to 64, and 13.6% who were 65 years of age or older. The median age was 33 years. For every 100 females, there were 98.0 males. For every 100 females age 18 and over, there were 96.1 males.

The median income for a household in the city was $46,301, and the median income for a family was $52,232. Males had a median income of $34,772 versus $27,962 for females. The per capita income for the city was $20,329.  About 8.2% of families and 11.6% of the population were below the poverty line, including 16.2% of those under age 18 and 5.7% of those age 65 or over.

Economy

According to the city's 2017 Comprehensive Annual Financial Report, the top employers in the city are:

Arts and culture

Oceanside Museum of Art is located in the cultural district section of downtown Oceanside.
The historic district of Mount Ecclesia, home to the Rosicrucian Fellowship, is noted for its singular architecture and the preservation of nature grounds and gardens, offering a unique meditative walking experience.
The California Surf Museum is located in downtown Oceanside.
Oceanside is home to the World's Largest Women's Surf Competition, the Supergirl Pro Jam event, which has been held yearly since 2007. 
 Each Thursday evening, downtown Oceanside hosts the Sunset Market, a gathering of local vendors, hot food and live entertainment.
 Founded in 2006, the Frontwave Credit Union O'side Turkey Trot hosts approximately 9,000 runners and walkers from 46 states and 8 countries. The O'Side Turkey Trot has been voted one of the top trots in the country several times.
 Since 2006, Oceanside has played host to the official start of the annual  bicycle race, Race Across America, which is usually held during the second week of June. It is considered the world's toughest sporting event by many experts.
 Oceanside has hosted the Beach Soccer Championships since 2007. The festival is the largest on the west coast and takes place the third weekend in May. The event has a PRO side to the event called The Beach Soccer USA Cup and it is considered to host the toughest competition of its kind in the United States.
 The Oceanside International Film Festival was founded in 2009 by the Oceanside Cultural Arts Foundation.
 The famous house in the film Top Gun, where Kelly McGillis and Tom Cruise shot a romantic scene. In 2019 the house was moved from its original site and extensively restored; it will become a free-standing attraction as part of a $180 million beachfront hotel project scheduled to open in Spring 2021.
 Oceanside is home to a harbor which contains a lighthouse, several shops and restaurants, the Oceanside Sign, and hundreds of boats.
 The TV series Animal Kingdom, based on the 2010 film of the same name, is set in Oceanside.

Government

The city operates under the council-manager form of government.  The city council consists of four members elected from districts and one mayor elected at large. The current council is composed of: Esther Sanchez (mayor), Ryan Keim (deputy mayor), Peter Weiss, Kori Jensen, and Christopher Rodriguez.

The current city treasurer is Victor Roy. The current city clerk is Zeb Navarro.

The City of Oceanside is a full-service city.  It provides its own police and fire safety, library, water and sewer services.  In addition, the city has a municipal airport, a small craft harbor, one of the longest wooden piers in the west, golf courses, swimming pools, numerous parks, community centers, and extensive palm-lined beaches.

State and federal representation

Education

Residents of Oceanside may attend schools in the Oceanside Unified School District, Vista Unified School District, Bonsall Union School District, Carlsbad Unified School District, Fallbrook Union High School District, or Fallbrook Union Elementary School District, depending on their address. The Oceanside Unified School District provides instrumental music programs in grades 4-12.

The Oceanside Unified School District has two comprehensive high schools, El Camino High School off Rancho Del Oro and Oceanside High School off Mission Avenue. High school students are also served by Ocean Shores Continuation High School and Clair Burgener Academy. OUSD has 24 schools plus three charter schools, including the School of Business and Technology, and two brand new schools, Louise Foussat Elementary School and Cesar Chavez Middle School, that opened in the Fall of 2007.

A free, independent public charter school, Scholarship Prep, is a new TK-8th grade school which was authorized to open in August 2017 and is sited at the historic San Luis Rey Mission. It offers a full educational experience for Oceanside students.

Transportation

Rail and air 
The Oceanside Transit Center is a major railway interchange for long distance and commuter rail services. Amtrak's Pacific Surfliner provides service to San Luis Obispo via Los Angeles and San Diego. Metrolink's commuter rail service connects Oceanside to many parts of Greater Los Angeles, while Coaster commuter rail serves northern and central San Diego County. The Sprinter light rail service connects Oceanside to Escondido.

Oceanside Municipal Airport (OCN) is mainly used a general aviation field. The nearest international airport is San Diego International Airport, connected to Oceanside via Amtrak and Coaster rail services.

Interstate and highways 
Interstate 5 (I-5) travels through Oceanside, connecting to California State Route 76 (SR 76) and California State Route 78 (SR 78) within the city.

Notable people

Sister cities
   Ensenada, Mexico
   Kisarazu, Japan
   Fuji, Japan
   Pago Pago, American Samoa

References

External links

 
 Oceanside Historical Society

 
Cities in San Diego County, California
North County (San Diego County)
Populated coastal places in California
San Diego metropolitan area
Incorporated cities and towns in California
Populated places established in 1888
1888 establishments in California
Seaside resorts in California